William Richard Woodward-Fisher (born 1956) is a retired British rower who competed for Great Britain.

Rowing career
Woodward-Fisher was part of the eight that reached the final and finished 5th, at the 1977 World Rowing Championships in Amsterdam.

References

1956 births
Living people
British male rowers